Killers of the Flower Moon: The Osage Murders and the Birth of the FBI is the third non-fiction book by the American journalist David Grann. The book was released on April 18, 2017 by Doubleday. Time magazine listed Killers of the Flower Moon as one of its top ten non-fiction books of 2017. A film adaptation directed by Martin Scorsese and set to star  Leonardo DiCaprio, Robert De Niro, Jesse Plemons, Brendan Fraser, and Lily Gladstone is currently in production for a 2023 release.

Synopsis
The book investigates a series of murders of wealthy Osage people that took place in Osage County, Oklahoma in the early 1920s—after big oil deposits were discovered beneath their land. After the Osage are awarded rights in court to the profits made from oil deposits found on their land, the Osage people prepare to receive the wealth to which they are legally entitled from sales of their oil deposits.

The Osage are viewed as the "middle man" and a complex plot is hatched to eliminate the Osage inheritors on a one-by-one basis by any means possible. Officially, the count of the full-blooded, wealthy Osage victims reaches at least twenty, but Grann suspects that hundreds more may have been killed because of their ties to oil. The book details the newly formed FBI's investigation of the murders, as well as the eventual trial and conviction of cattleman William Hale as the mastermind behind the plot.

Reception
The review aggregator website Book Marks indicated that overall Killers of the Flower Moon received rave reviews from literary critics.

Writing for The New York Times, Dave Eggers called the book "riveting" and wrote, "in these last pages, Grann takes what was already a fascinating and disciplined recording of a forgotten chapter in American history, and with the help of contemporary Osage tribe members, he illuminates a sickening conspiracy that goes far deeper than those four years of horror. It will sear your soul."

Sean Woods of Rolling Stone praised Grann's book, noting, "In his masterful new book...Grann chronicles a tale of murder, betrayal, heroism and a nation's struggle to leave its frontier culture behind and enter the modern world... Filled with almost mythic characters from our past – stoic Texas Rangers, corrupt robber barons, private detectives, and murderous desperadoes like the Al Spencer gang – Grann's story amounts to a secret history of the American frontier."

A reviewer of Publishers Weekly stated "New Yorker staff writer Grann (The Lost City of Z) burnishes his reputation as a brilliant storyteller in this gripping true-crime narrative, which revisits a baffling and frightening—and relatively unknown—spree of murders occurring mostly in Oklahoma during the 1920s."

Ed Vulliamy of The Guardian wrote, "The genocide by white America against Native nations during the century leading up to Grann’s period is a metaphor for humanity’s decimation of the natural world which the Natives saw as sacred. Grann’s book is a timely and disturbing chapter in the original, terrible atrocity."

Film adaptation

The book is being adapted into a film directed by Martin Scorsese and starring Leonardo DiCaprio, Robert De Niro, Lily Gladstone, Brendan Fraser, and Jesse Plemons on a budget of over $200 million. It will be released theatrically by Paramount Pictures and stream on Apple TV+ in 2023.

Though the role of Tom White, the lead FBI agent, was initially written for DiCaprio, DiCaprio pushed to have his role changed to the nephew of the film's primary antagonist, who will be played by De Niro. As a result, it was reported that Jesse Plemons was cast as Tom White to replace DiCaprio, while DiCaprio was cast as Ernest Burkhart.

References

External links

2017 non-fiction books
21st-century history books
Doubleday (publisher) books
Books about Oklahoma
Books set in the Osage Nation
Books set during the Osage Murders
1920s in Oklahoma
Non-fiction books adapted into films
Novels set in Oklahoma